Ulaidh may refer to:

Ulaid, a medieval over-kingdom (also known as a province) in north-eastern Ireland, which is spelt as Ulaidh in modern Irish.
Ulster, one of the four traditional provinces of Ireland, located in the north of the island, and which is known as Ulaidh in Irish.